Friedrich Clemens Gerke Tower is a 230 metre tall telecommunication tower of reinforced concrete in Cuxhaven in Germany. Friedrich Clemens Gerke Tower, which is named after Friedrich Clemens Gerke, was completed in 1991 and is not accessible for tourists. In spite of its size, it is only used as receiving point for cable TV, as a radio relay station and as a mobile phone transmitter, but not for broadcasting. The tower was designed by architects Gerhard Kreisel, Dipl. Ing. and Günter H. Müller Dipl. Ing., Kiel´.

External links
 
 http://www.seefunknetz.de/gerke.htm 
 http://skyscraperpage.com/diagrams/?b2089

See also
 List of towers

Communication towers in Germany
Towers completed in 1991
1991 establishments in Germany
Round towers